Soprani is an Italian surname. Notable people with the surname include:

Luciano Soprani (1946–1999), Italian fashion designer
Raffaele Soprani (1612–1672), Italian art historian
Wanda Soprani (born 1940), Italian artistic gymnast

Italian-language surnames